Sukhdev Singh (born 21 September 1991) born in Hoshiarpur, Punjab is an Indian professional footballer who plays as a defender for Mohun Bagan in the I-League.

Career

Minerva
He made his debut for Minerva on 25 November 2017 in I-League match against Mohun Bagan at Guru Nanak Stadium, Ludhiana as he played full match as his team drew match 1-1.
Sukhdev Singh played a pivotal role in Minerva's I-League triumph.

Mohun Bagan
In May 2018 he joined Mohun Bagan.

However, on 15 September 2018 AIFF banned him for 6 months for contract violation.

Sukhdev Singh has been banned from playing any competitive match and also must pay a fine of Rs 50,000 each to AIFF and Minerva Punjab FC.

In July 2019 Mohun Bagan retained him for the 2019-20 I-League season. He came in as a 2nd half substitute for Mohun Bagan in their first preseason friendly against Salgaocar FC, which is his return to football after the ban.

Club
Statistics accurate as of 29 July 2018

Honours

Club
Minerva Punjab
I-League: 2017–18

References

External links 

 Profile.

1991 births
Living people
Footballers from Hoshiarpur
Indian footballers
RoundGlass Punjab FC players
I-League players
Association football defenders